Big Sky was an Australian television drama series produced by John Edwards that ran for two seasons on Network Ten from 1997 to 1999.

The show centred on the adventures of the pilots of a small aviation company in Australia called "Big Sky Aviation" and the battles of the owner to keep the company running. Chief pilot Chris Manning is determined to look after his team, even if that conflicts with the new boss, Lauren Allen, who has inherited the company following the death of her father.

Cast
 Gary Sweet as Chris Manning
 Ally Fowler as Lauren Allen
 Rhys Muldoon as Jimbo James
 Martin Henderson as Scotty Gibbs
 Lisa Baumwol as Lexie Ciani (season 1)
 Robyn Cruze as Shay McWilliam
 Bille Brown as Lightfoot (season 2)
 Danielle Nuss as Paula Niessen (season 2)
 Tim Campbell as Blake Wallace (season 2)
 Peta Brady as Rosie Day (season 2)

Locations
 Sydney Airport

Episodes

Season One (1997)

Season Two (1998)

Home media 

It was announced by Via Vision Entertainment in March 2019 that they would be releasing the complete collection of Big Sky on DVD in three Collections.

See also
List of Australian television series

External links

 Australian Television Information Archive

Australian drama television series
Network 10 original programming
1997 Australian television series debuts
1999 Australian television series endings
Aviation television series
English-language television shows
Television series by Endemol Australia
Television shows set in New South Wales